Stalin (masculine, Russian: Сталин) or Stalina (feminine, Russian: Сталина) is a given name and a surname. It is strongly associated with Soviet dictator Joseph Stalin.

Surname
Joseph Stalin (1878–1953), major figure in Russian and world history of the early to mid-20th century
Joseph Stalin (trade unionist), a Sri Lankan figure
Kerstin-Maria Stalín (born 1937), Swedish politician
Svetlana Alliluyeva (Stalina) (1926–2011), Soviet philologist, daughter of Joseph Stalin
Udhayanidhi Stalin (born 1977), Indian film producer, son of M. K. Stalin
Vasily Dzhugashvili Stalin (1921–1962), Soviet general, son of Joseph Stalin

Given name
 M. K. Stalin (born 1953), Chief Minister of Tamil Nadu, Indian politician
 Stalin Colinet (born 1974), American football player
 Stalin González (born 1980), Venezuelan politician
 Stalin K, Indian filmmaker
 Stalin Motta (born 1984), Colombian football player
 Stalin Ortiz (born 1981), Colombian basketball player
 Stalin Rivas (1971), Venezuelan football player